Magnus Brunner (born 6 May 1972) is an Austrian politician of the Austrian People's Party (ÖVP) who has been serving as Austria's finance minister since 6 December 2021 in the government of Chancellor Karl Nehammer.

Early life and education
Brunner studied jurisprudence at the University of Innsbruck, the University of Vienna (Dr. iur.) and King's College London (LLM).

Political career
Brunner was a member of the Federal Council for the Austrian People's Party (ÖVP) from 1 May 2009 until 6 January 2020. 

Brunner served as state secretary (Staatssekretär) in the Ministry of Climate Action, Environment, Energy, Mobility, Innovation, and Technology in the government of Chancellor Sebastian Kurz.

Other activities

European Union organizations
 European Investment Bank (EIB), Ex-Officio Member of the Board of Governors (since 2021)
 European Stability Mechanism (ESM), Member of the Board of Governors (since 2021)

International organizations
 Asian Development Bank (ADB), Ex-Officio Member of the Board of Governors (since 2021)
 European Bank for Reconstruction and Development (EBRD), Ex-Officio Member of the Board of Governors (since 2021)
 Inter-American Development Bank (IDB), Ex-Officio Member of the Board of Governors (since 2021)
 Multilateral Investment Guarantee Agency (MIGA), World Bank Group, Ex-Officio Member of the Board of Governors (since 2021)
 World Bank, Ex-Officio Member of the Board of Governors (since 2021)

Non-profit organizations
 National Fund of the Republic of Austria for Victims of National Socialism, Member of the Board of Trustees (since 2021)

References

1972 births
Living people
Alumni of King's College London
Austrian People's Party politicians
Finance Ministers of Austria
Members of the Federal Council (Austria)
University of Innsbruck alumni
University of Vienna alumni